BNTM may refer to:

 Britain's Next Top Model
 Brazil's Next Top Model
 Benelux' Next Top Model